Zhovhe Dam is a reservoir on the Mzingwane River, Zimbabwe with a capacity of 133 million cubic metres. It supplies water for commercial irrigation and the town of Beitbridge.

Development 
The dam is among the biggest 10 dams in the country and has turned the dry area into a green belt through irrigation projects. The dam also hosts a 30 roomed lodge that accommodates up to 100 people

References

Dams on the Mzingwane River
Beitbridge District
Buildings and structures in Matabeleland South Province